The 1997 Caribbean Cup (known as Shell/Umbro Caribbean Cup for sponsorship reasons ) was the ninth edition of the Caribbean Cup hosted by Antigua and Barbuda and Saint Kitts and Nevis.

Qualifying Tournament

First stage
The winners of each group enter the qualifying play-off.

Group 1

Group 2

  and  withdrew

Group 3
First round
 Both matches were played in Georgetown, Guyana

Second round

  also entered the match; but since they already secured a spot in the final tournament as the holders, their matches were counted merely as friendlies.

Group 4

Group 5
 and  withdrew.

The return round was not played.

Qualifying Playoff

The return round was not played.

 received a lucky bye to the final tournament.
 The qualified teams are:  (holders),  (co-hosts),  (co-hosts),  and

Final tournament

Group A

Hosted in Antigua and Barbuda

Group B

Hosted in Saint Kitts and Nevis

Semifinals

3rd Place Playoff

Final

References 

Caribbean Cup
International association football competitions hosted by Antigua and Barbuda
International sports competitions hosted by Saint Kitts and Nevis
Car
Caribbean Cup
1997 in Saint Kitts and Nevis